Angraecopsis tridens is a species of plant in the family Orchidaceae. It is found in Cameroon and Equatorial Guinea. Its natural habitats are subtropical or tropical moist lowland forests and subtropical or tropical moist montane forests. It is threatened by habitat loss.

References 

Vulnerable plants
tridens
Orchids of Cameroon
Orchids of Equatorial Guinea
Taxonomy articles created by Polbot